Vladimir Sergeevich Permyakov (born  December 2, 1952 in Kansk) is a Russian actor, known for his part as Lyonya Golubkov in a notorious MMM commercial. He also starred in several Russian films and TV series.

References

External links
 Official site

1952 births
Living people
Soviet male actors
Russian male actors
People from Kansk